Samtse Gewog (Dzongkha: བསམ་རྩེ་) is a gewog (village block) of Samtse District, Bhutan.

The village of Chengmari is located within the district.

References

Gewogs of Bhutan
Samtse District